The 2010 EAFF East Asian Football Championship was the fourth edition of the tournament which was held between 6 and 14 February 2010. Two preliminary competitions were held during 2009.

Participating teams

Preliminary

Round 1

Round 2

 – Winner of Preliminary Competition

Finals
 – 2008 East Asian Football Championship Third Place
 – Winner of Semifinal Competition
 – 2010 FIFA World Cup participating team
 – 2010 FIFA World Cup participating team

Preliminary Competition

Round 1
The first round of preliminary competition was hosted by Guam.  The winner of the group advanced to the Round 2 of preliminary competition.

Matches
All times listed are Chamorro Standard Time (ChST) – UTC+10

Awards

Round 2
The second round of preliminary competition was held in Kaohsiung, Taiwan.  The winner of the group advanced to the Finals.

MatchesAll times listed are National Standard Time (NST) – UTC+8Awards

Final round

Squads

Results and matches
The final competition was held in Japan.All times listed are Japan Standard Time (JST) – UTC+9''

Awards

Goalscorers

Final standing

References

External links
 Official website of East Asian Football Championship 2010 Final Competition by JFA
 Official website of East Asian Football Championship 2010 Preliminary Competition by EAFF
 Official website of East Asian Football Championship 2010 Semi-Final Competition by EAFF
 Official website of East Asian Football Championship 2010 Final Competition by EAFF

East
East
2010
2010
2010
2010 in Japanese football